Live in Paris is a 1987 live album by American jazz singer Dee Dee Bridgewater. The concert was recorded on 24–25 November, 1986 at the jazz club New Morning in Paris. She is accompanied by her piano trio of the time.
The repertoire reaches from jazz standards including Miles Davis' "All Blues" (with–although not credited–the lyrics by Oscar Brown Jr.) and the up-tempo "Cherokee" mostly associated with Charlie Parker, and sung by Sarah Vaughan, a "Blues Medley" to Aretha Franklin's Dr. Feelgood. She seemed leave her disco-funk efforts in America behind. Her following album Victim of Love would be another, before she left pop productions for good.

Release history
The album was initially released in France via Just'In Distribution on LP and MC with 4 songs on each side. Producer Jean-Pierre Grosz licensed the copyright to Gala Records in Italy and Charly Records for the whole European market, through which it also appeared on Affinity in the UK. All releases were distributed with the same front and back cover. On Compact Discs issued by Charly and Affinity the concert had an extra track as opener, "How High the Moon". In 1989 MCA finally released the album  in the US on their Impulse! label, but omitting "How High the Moon" on CD as well. When Bridgewater was under contract with Universal in France in the 1990s, the album was digitally remastered and reissued on Verve and EmArcy (with the 9th track at the end). The production is now credited to Bridgewater.

Reception
Scott Yanow of Allmusic wrote: "This 1986 recording started her artistic "comeback" and showed that she had developed and matured during her years in Europe. Backed by her regular French rhythm section, Bridgewater is in spirited and creative form.... Her arrival as a major singer in the years since this set has been a welcome event. Recommended." Jeff Simon of The Buffalo News noted, "Terrific. Until a whole new wave of singers came along in the '80s, expatriate Bridgewater was one of the precious few keeping alive the tradition of jazz song... Living in Paris has done her good. She has -- literally -- never been better than this."

Jack Fuller of the Chicago Tribune stated: "Here`s one for the permanent collection. Dee Dee Bridgewater has what only a few jazz singers each generation has-the ideas, the energy and the vocal equipment to make the music complete. Bridgewater delivers on everything from the Erroll Garner standard, 'Misty,' to the down and dirty 'Dr. Feelgood' and 'Medley Blues.' And when she improvises, it has just the right balance of reference and innovaton. The references may be to Sarah Vaughan, Carmen McRae, and Betty Carter, but you'd better think of adding Dee Dee Bridgewater to the short list of standards."

Track listing

Personnel
Band
Dee Dee Bridgewater – vocals
Hervé Sellin – piano
Antoine Bonfils – bass
André Ceccarelli – drums

Production
Jean-Pierre Grosz – producer
Jean-Pierre Gouache – recording engineer
Jean-Louis Bucchi – mixing

References

External links 

Dee Dee Bridgewater live albums
1987 live albums